Howley is a town in the Canadian province of Newfoundland and Labrador, with a population of 179. It is located on Route 401, 13 km from the Trans-Canada Highway (Route 1), approximately thirty minutes' drive from the Deer Lake Airport. Services include a pub (Trapper's Lounge), a convenience store (Howley Shopping Centre), a bed and breakfast, a campground, and a hotel.

Demographics 

See also
 List of cities and towns in Newfoundland and Labrador

References 

Towns in Newfoundland and Labrador